The International Journal of Law, Crime and Justice is a quarterly peer-reviewed academic journal covering criminology and various legal disciplines, including criminal law and the sociology of law. It was established in 1973 as the International Journal of Criminology and Penology, and in 1979, it was renamed the International Journal of the Sociology of Law. It obtained its current name in 2008. It is published by Elsevier and the editors-in-chief are John Carrier (London School of Economics), Sarah Charman, and Stephen P. Savage (University of Portsmouth). According to the Journal Citation Reports, the journal has a 2016 impact factor of 0.407.

References

External links

Publications established in 1973
Criminology journals
Criminal law journals
Sociology of law
Elsevier academic journals
Quarterly journals
English-language journals